Abhaipur urf Lakhimipur (before also known as Nizampur when it was a part of Daudpur) is a village in Ghazipur District of Uttar Pradesh, India.

References

Villages in Ghazipur district